The Senator Robert D. Fleming Bridge, commonly known as the 62nd Street Bridge, is a truss bridge that carries  Pennsylvania Route 8 across the Allegheny River between the Pittsburgh neighborhoods of Morningside and Lawrenceville and Sharpsburg, Pennsylvania.

History 
The Allegheny was first crossed at this point by a wooden bridge, built in 1856. This was replaced by the Sharpsburg Bridge in 1901, which was itself replaced in 1962, as it was deemed too narrow for the traffic volume that it carried.

The current bridge was completed on July 1, 1962, and is named for Robert D. Fleming, a former Republican Pennsylvania state senator whose district included portions of Pittsburgh's northeastern suburbs.

The bridge was reopened in January 1983.

See also 
List of crossings of the Allegheny River

References

External links 

Senator Robert D. Fleming Bridge at pghbridges.com

Bridges over the Allegheny River
Fleming
Bridges completed in 1962
Road bridges in Pennsylvania
Cantilever bridges in the United States
Warren truss bridges in the United States